Pir Morad or Pirmorad or Pir-e Morad may refer to:

Pir-e Morad, Fars
Pir Morad, Lorestan
Pir Morad, West Azerbaijan